The kickboxing event at the World Games 2017 was held at the Orbita Hall in Poland.
For the first time, kickboxing was included in the World Games 2017 as an invitational sport.

Events

Light welterweight (60-63.5 kg)
Welterweight (63.5–67 kg)
Light middleweight (67–71 kg)
Middleweight (71–75 kg)
Light heavyweight (75–81 kg)
Cruiserweight (81–86 kg)
Heavyweight (86–91 kg)
Super heavyweight (+91 kg)

Qualifying criteria

Qualifications for the World Games 2017 were held at the WAKO Continental Championships that were organized by each WAKO Continental Federation/ Confederation as follows:
WAKO African Championships in Morocco (December 2016)
WAKO Pan American Championships (27 -30 October 2016)
WAKO European Championships (22-29 October 2016)
WAKO Asian Championships (1-9 August 2015) and (October 2016)
To ensure that all Continents will be represented by the best athletes in each weight class, athletes will be selected as follows:
From WAKO Europe: 4 athletes.
From WAKO Pan America: 1 athletes.
From WAKO Asia: 1 athlete
From WAKO Africa: 1 athletes
The remaining one place in each weight class will be split evenly to 6/6 as follows:
WAKO Asia: 6 Weight classes
WAKO Pan America: 6 Weight classes.

Qualification
The following tournaments were used as qualification tournaments for kickboxing at the 2017 World games:
Africa
The African Kickboxing Championships 2016 (K1 Rules style) which was held from the 21 to 25 December 2016 in Rabat, Morocco, served as qualification of African Kickboxing Confederation Athletes for 2017 World Games. 
Asia
The 2015 and 2016 Asian Kickboxing Championships acted consecutively, as stage one and stage two for the Asian qualifications of the 2017 World games.
Stage one was held from the 1st till the 9th of August 2015 in Pune, India.

The 2016 Asian Kickboxing Championships K1 Rules (stage two of the qualifications) were held over three days in Cheongju, Korea during October 2016, by the Asian Kickboxing Confederation (WAKO Asia) on the occasion of the Cheongju World Martial Arts Masterships with the participation of  16 member federations which competed in 12 weight categories.

Europe
The European championships which was held from the 23 to 30 October 2016 in Maribor, Slovenia, was part of the K1 WAKO qualifying system for The World Games 2017.

Pan America
The Pan American championships were held in Cancun, Mexico, from October 26 to 29, 2016.
The event was the Pan American qualifications for the World Games organized by the   International World Games Association (IWGA) in July 2017, in Wroclaw, Poland.
The American Continent has the right for 18 vacancies in 12 official categories at K1 Rules (8 for men and 4 for women) for the IWGA World Games 2017.

Venue
The Orbita Hall located in Wroclaw hosted martial arts during The World Games 2017.

Participating nations

Medalists

Men

Women

Medal table

References

External links
 The World Games 2017 Wrocław
 Results book

 
2017 World Games
2017 in kickboxing
Kickboxing in Poland